Stefan Đorđević (also transliterated Stefan Djordjević; born 13 March 1991) is a Serbian football defender who plays for Vojvodina in the Serbian SuperLiga.

Career statistics

Honours
Vojvodina
Serbian Cup: 2019–20

References

External links
 
 
 
 Stefan Đorđević at Utakmica.rs 

1991 births
Living people
Footballers from Novi Sad
Association football defenders
Serbian footballers
FK Proleter Novi Sad players
FK Spartak Subotica players
FK Banat Zrenjanin players
FK Voždovac players
Red Star Belgrade footballers
FK Borac Čačak players
Catania S.S.D. players
FK Radnički Niš players
FK Vojvodina players
Serbian SuperLiga players
Serbian First League players
Serie C players
Serbian expatriate footballers
Expatriate footballers in Italy